Ventress is a census-designated place located in Pointe Coupee Parish, Louisiana, United States, along the northeastern end of the False River. The population of the area is approximately 1,100. It is home to the Hunter Fabre Post 248 American Legion Hall on Legion Road (Louisiana Highway 413). The zip code is 70783.

Demographics

Notable people
J. E. Jumonville Jr., former member of the Louisiana State Senate, rancher, and horse breeder
Catherine D. Kimball, former chief justice of the Louisiana Supreme Court
Clyde Kimball, member of the Louisiana House of Representatives for Pointe Coupee and West Baton Rouge parishes, 1976-1992
Patrick Queen, NFL linebacker for the Baltimore Ravens
Ventruss, Metalcore band formed in Ventress

Major highways
  Louisiana Highway 413
  Louisiana Highway 414
  Louisiana Highway 415

References

Unincorporated communities in Pointe Coupee Parish, Louisiana
Baton Rouge metropolitan area
Census-designated places in Louisiana